Gaston School is a historic high school building located at Gaston, Northampton County, North Carolina. It was designed by architect Leslie Boney and built about 1950, with additions made about 1952; 1955, about 1962, and about 1968.  It is a brick-clad, flat-roofed, one-story Modernist building.  Also on the property is the contributing home economics and auto shop building (c. 1952, c. 1968).  The school closed about 1990.

It was listed on the National Register of Historic Places in 2012.

References

High schools in North Carolina
School buildings on the National Register of Historic Places in North Carolina
School buildings completed in 1950
Buildings and structures in Northampton County, North Carolina
National Register of Historic Places in Northampton County, North Carolina
1950 establishments in North Carolina